Bangolo Department is a department of Guémon Region in Montagnes District, Ivory Coast. In 2021, its population was 270,629 and its seat is the settlement of Bangolo. The sub-prefectures of the department are Bangolo, Béoué-Zibiao, Bléniméouin, Diéouzon, Gohouo-Zagna, Guinglo-Tahouaké,  Kahin-Zarabaon, Zéo, and Zou.

History
Bangolo Department was created in 1988 as a first-level subdivision via a split-off from Man Department.

In 1997, regions were introduced as new first-level subdivisions of Ivory Coast; as a result, all departments were converted into second-level subdivisions. Bangolo Department was included in Dix-Huit Montagnes Region.

In 2011, districts were introduced as new first-level subdivisions of Ivory Coast. At the same time, regions were reorganised and became second-level subdivisions and all departments were converted into third-level subdivisions. At this time, Bangolo Department became part of Guémon Region in Montagnes District.

Notes

Departments of Guémon
1988 establishments in Ivory Coast
States and territories established in 1988